is a city located in Gunma Prefecture, Japan. , the city had an estimated population of 64,539 in 27,616 households, and a population density of 360 persons per km².

Geography
Fujioka is located on the southern border of Gunma Prefecture, bordered by Saitama Prefecture to the south.

Physical features

Mountains
 Nishi-Mikaboyama (西御荷鉾山), 1246m
 Higashi-Mikaboyama (東御荷鉾山) 1286m
 Amefuriyama (雨降山)
 Sakurayama (桜山), 591m
 Takayama (高山)
 Koshinyama (庚申山)

Rivers
 Karasugawa
 Kaburagawa (鏑川)
 Ayugawa (鮎川)
 Nukuigawa (温井川)
 Kannagawa (神流川)
 Sannagawa (三名川)
 Sasagawa (笹川)

Lakes and marshes
 Kannako (神流湖)
 Sannako (三名湖)
 Ayugawako (鮎川湖)
 Takenuma (竹沼)

Surrounding municipalities
Gunma Prefecture
 Takasaki
 Tamamura
 Kanna
 Shimonita
 Kanra
Saitama Prefecture
 Chichibu
 Kamikawa
 Kamisato

Climate
Fujioka has a Humid continental climate (Köppen Cfa) characterized by warm summers and cold winters with heavy snowfall.  The average annual temperature in Fujioka is 13.8 °C. The average annual rainfall is 1239 mm with September as the wettest month. The temperatures are highest on average in August, at around 26.1 °C, and lowest in January, at around 2.5 °C.

Demographics
Per Japanese census data, the population of Fujioka has remained relatively steady over the past 40 years.

History
Fujioka is located within traditional Kōzuke Province. During the late Sengoku period it developed as a jōkamachi around Ashida Castle, the center of a 30,000 koku holding by the Ashida clan, retainers of Tokugawa Ieyasu. However, the foundation of the Edo period Tokugawa shogunate, the area  tenryō territory under the direct control of the shogunate. Fujioka and Onishi towns, and Kanna, Ono, Midori, Mikuri, Hirai, Hino, and Sanbagawa Village were created in Midorino District, Gunma Prefecture and Mihara village in Minamikanra District, Gunma Prefecture on April 1, 1889 with the creation of the modern municipalities system after the Meiji Restoration. In 1896, Minamikanra District was united with Midorino District and Tago District to create Tano District. On April 1, 1954, Fujioka annexed Kanna, Ono, Midori and Mikuri villages and was elevated to city status. On March 1, 1955 Fujioka annexed neighboring Hirai and Sanbagawa villages. On January 1, 2006 Onishi Village was merged into Fujioka City.

Government
Fujioka has a mayor-council form of government with a directly elected mayor and a unicameral city council of 18 members. Fujioka, together with the town of Kanna, and the village of Ueno contributes two members to the Gunma Prefectural Assembly. In terms of national politics, the town is part of Gunma 4th district of the lower house of the Diet of Japan.

Economy

Education
Fujioka has 11 public elementary schools and five public middle schools operated by the city government, and three public high schools operated by the Gunma Prefectural Board of Education. The prefecture also operates a special education school for the handicapped.

High schools
 Fujioka Kita  (群馬県立藤岡北高等学校)
 Fujioka Kogyo (群馬県立藤岡工業高等学校)
 Fujioka Chuo  (群馬県立藤岡中央高等学校)

Middle schools
 Fujioka Kita    (藤岡市立北中学校)
 Fujioka Higashi (藤岡市立東中学校)
 Fujioka Nishi   (藤岡市立西中学校)
 Fujioka Ono     (藤岡市立小野中学校)
 Fujioka Onishi  (藤岡市立鬼石中学校)

Elementary schools
 Fujioka Dai-ichi (藤岡第一小学校)
 Fujioka Dai-ni   (藤岡第二小学校)
 Kanna            (神流小学校)
 Ono              (小野小学校)
 Midori           (美土里小学校)
 Mikuri Higashi   (美九里東小学校)
 Mikuri Nishi     (美九里西小学校)
 Hirai            (平井小学校)
 Hino             (日野小学校)
 Onishi Kita      (鬼石北小学校)
 Onishi           (鬼石小学校)

Transportation

Railway
 JR East – Hachikō Line
  -

Highway

Expressways
Two expressways converge at the Fujioka Junction.
  Kan-etsu Expressway -  Fujioka Junction
  Jōshin-etsu Expressway - Fujioka Interchange (IC),  Fujioka Parking Area (PA)

National highways

Local attractions
Sanbaseki Gorge, National Place of Scenic Beauty
Fujioka History Museum
Site of Hirai Castle
Shimokubo Dam
Shinsui Dam
Takenuma Dam

National Historic Sites
Takayamasha Sericulture School, also a UNESCO World Heritage Site
Nanakoshiyama Kofun
Yuzurihara Stone Age Residence Site
Shiroishi Inariyama Kofun
Hongō Haniwa Kiln ruins

Annual Events
Fujioka Matsuri
The Fujioka Matsuri is a two-day summer festival which is typically held on a weekend in late July. The celebration, which takes place in central Fujioka, features food and entertainment stalls, a flea market, parade, and street dancing. There are many traditional events as well, such as taiko performances, mikoshi carrying, and the parading of dashi floats through the streets.

Fuji Matsuri
The Fuji Matsuri (Wisteria Festival) is a spring festival which takes place at Koshinyama Park every year in late April/early May, to celebrate the blooming of the wisteria flowers. Numerous vendor stalls sell various local products, food, and flowers. The wisteria flowers are illuminated after sunset.

Noted people from Fujioka
Jiro Horikoshi- aeronautical engineer, who designed the Mitsubishi A6M Zero and other notable aircraft 
Hideyuki Nakayama, actor
Atsushi Sakurai- vocalist of the rock band Buck-Tick
Hisashi Imai- guitarist of the rock band Buck-Tick
Hidehiko Hoshino- guitarist of the rock band Buck-Tick

Friendship and Sister city relations 
  Hakui, Ishikawa, Japan
  Jiangyin, China, since April 28, 2000  
  Regina, Saskatchewan, Canada, since August 3, 2019

References

External links

Official Website 

Cities in Gunma Prefecture
Fujioka, Gunma